Thomas Heggen (December 23, 1918 – May 19, 1949) was an American author best known for his 1946 novel Mister Roberts and its adaptations to stage and screen. Heggen became an Oklahoman in 1935, when in the depths of the Depression his father's business failed and his family moved from Iowa to Oklahoma City for work. He was Wallace Stegner's cousin.

Navy service
After attending Oklahoma City University, Oklahoma State University, and graduating from the University of Minnesota, where he was classmate of Max Shulman, Thomas R. St. George and Norman Katkov, with a degree in journalism, Heggen moved to New York City and became an editor for Reader's Digest. He joined the U.S. Navy immediately after the attack on Pearl Harbor and was commissioned as a lieutenant in August 1942. For the duration of the War, he served on supply vessels in the North Atlantic, the Caribbean and the Pacific, the latter as assistant communications officer on the cargo ship USS Virgo and also the USS Rotanin.

During his 14 months aboard the Virgo, Heggen wrote a collection of vignettes about daily life on the ship, which he described as sailing "from Tedium to Apathy and back again, with an occasional side trip to Monotony". Like his fictional alter ego Doug Roberts, he felt "left out" of the War and butted heads with his commander, a coarse martinet who repeatedly denied his requests for transfer to a destroyer. The fictional "Captain Morton" of the movie and dramatizations was Naval Reserve Lieutenant Commander Herbert Ezra Randall, a Merchant Marine officer. According to Naval History magazine, Randall "had disdain for the ways of the Navy. Like his fictional “Old Stupid” counterpart, Captain Randall did own two palm trees, and like the characters Doug Roberts and Ensign Pulver, Heggen threw them over the side."

Mister Roberts
Following his discharge in December 1945, he returned to New York and reworked the material into a loosely structured novel, adding an introductory chapter. His original title, The Iron-Bound Bucket, was changed to Mister Roberts by the publisher.

Despite mixed reviews, it sold over one million copies and made Heggen the toast of the New York literary scene, followed by a lucrative offer to adapt the book for the Broadway stage. For this, he enlisted the aid of humorist Max Shulman but the collaboration did not work out. He then turned to producer-director Joshua Logan, who emphasized the work's farcical elements while retaining its serious undertones. With Henry Fonda in the title role, the 1948 stage version of Mister Roberts was a smash. Heggen and Logan shared the first Tony Award presented for Best Play.

Death
Bewildered by the fame he had longed for, and under pressure to turn out another bestseller, he found himself with a crippling case of writer's block. "I don't know how I wrote Mister Roberts," he admitted to a friend. "It was spirit writing". He became an insomniac and tried to cure it with increasing amounts of alcohol and prescription drugs. On May 19, 1949, Heggen drowned in his bathtub at age 30 after an overdose of sleeping pills. His death was ruled a probable suicide, though he left no note and those close to him insisted it was an accident.

References

External links
 
 
 

1918 births
1949 suicides
20th-century American novelists
American male novelists
Suicides by drowning in the United States
Suicides in New York City
Drug-related suicides in New York City
Tony Award winners
University of Minnesota School of Journalism and Mass Communication alumni
People from Fort Dodge, Iowa
20th-century American dramatists and playwrights
American male dramatists and playwrights
20th-century American male writers
United States Navy personnel of World War II
United States Navy officers
Drug-related deaths in New York City
1949 deaths
Military personnel from Iowa